Kitchen Disco – Live at the London Palladium is a live album by English singer Sophie Ellis-Bextor, released on 25 November 2022 by EBGB's and Cooking Vinyl. The album was recorded at London Palladium on 30 March 2022.
 
The album was announced in September 2022 with Ellis-Bextor saying: "Doing the Kitchen Disco tour was the end of a promise I made during our lockdown discos... to bring the party to a live audience. I'm so happy we have this recording from the London Palladium so I can relive it and share it with you!"

Reception 
An Amazon editorial review said, "On the back of her incredible Kitchen Disco Instagram parties during lockdown and the accompanying Greatest Hits album Songs from the Kitchen Disco, Sophie took her incredible live show back on the road in front of a live audience once again at the start of 2022. With a setlist featuring all the hits plus an incredible array of cover versions all given the Kitchen Disco treatment, fans were in for a treat.

Track listing

Charts

References

 

 

2022 live albums
Sophie Ellis-Bextor albums
Cooking Vinyl albums
Sophie Ellis-Bextor live albums